William Derek Drake (born 7 February 1962) is an English musician, keyboardist, pianist, composer and singer-songwriter. He is best known as a former member of the cult English rock band Cardiacs, whom he played with for nine years between 1983 and 1992. He has also been a member of the Sea Nymphs, North Sea Radio Orchestra, Nervous, Wood, Lake of Puppies and The Grown-Ups, as well as pursuing a career as a solo artist. He is a distant cousin of the English singer-songwriter Nick Drake.

Biography and career

Early years
William Derek Drake began playing the harmonium as soon as he was able to stand. He began learning the piano at the age of five, training by playing duets with his grandmother before taking formal lessons. He went on to play with numerous bands during his schooldays

On leaving art college, Drake took a telesales job where he met punk singer/trumpet player Little Sue. He played a gig with her band Honour Our Trumpet at The Grey Horse in Kingston-upon-Thames in 1983. The sound engineer for the concert was Tim Smith, otherwise known as the leader of the Kingston-based band Cardiacs, a rapidly developing cult act with a taste for complex compositions. Intrigued by Drake's skills, Smith immediately wrote out a complicated piece for Drake, who performed it with ease. Smith then immediately recruited Drake into Cardiacs, apparently by telling him that he was now a member of the band whether he liked it or not.

Work with Cardiacs, The Sea Nymphs & The Grown-Ups (1983–1992, 1998)
Drake's first gig with Cardiacs was at The Marquee Club in Wardour Street, London in August 1983, supporting Here & Now. He joined the band towards the end of the recording sessions for their album The Seaside (released in 1984) and consequently only performed on "a couple of tracks".

Meanwhile, Drake, Tim Smith and Sarah Smith formed a new band in parallel to Cardiacs, initially simply called Mr and Mrs Smith and Mr Drake. Whilst the Cardiacs sound was clearly at the core of the new band, the rock guitars and drums were stripped away, replaced with atmospheric soaring string sounds, faintly wintery chiming and tinkling effects and angelic vocals, with Drake's piano as the central instrument. Astonishingly all this was recorded on four-track, for the eponymous 1984 cassette album Mr and Mrs Smith and Mr Drake. It was initially available from the fan club and at Cardiacs gigs, and was eventually released on CD in 2002 by Tim Smith's label All My Eye and Betty Martin Music.

Drake was a fully fledged recording member of Cardiacs by the 1985 Cardiacs EP "Seaside Treats", and also played on the 1986 Big Ship mini-album and the 1986 Rude Bootleg live album. In 1987, he performed on two Cardiacs 12-inch singles, "There's Too Many Irons in the Fire" and "Is This the Life". Drake also played a major part on the next Cardiacs album, 1988's A Little Man and a House and the Whole World Window for which he co-composed the songs "I'm Eating in Bed" and "The Whole World Window". 1988 also saw the release of another single – the Kinks cover "Susannah's Still Alive", released in 7" & 12" versions – and a BBC Radio 1 sessions EP (Night Tracks (The Janice Long Session)), as well as a second live album called Cardiacs Live.

Drake's compositional role in Cardiacs had increased by the time of the recording of the On Land and in the Sea album in 1989, for which he co-composed four songs – "I Hold My Love in My Arms" (featuring music he'd originally written at the age of fifteen), "The Duck and Roger the Horse", "Mares Nest" and "The Everso Closely Guarded Line". He also appeared on the accompanying  "Baby Heart Dirt" 7-and-12" single. In 1990, Cardiacs recorded a live concert in Salisbury in which Drake was part of a seven-piece band. This was released as the Maresnest live video in 1992 and as the live album All That Glitters Is a Mares Nest in 1995. The 1991 Songs for Ships and Irons compilation collected together various EP tracks originally released between 1986 and 1987 (including two songs co-written by Drake, "Tarred and Feathered" and "Blind in Safety and Leafy in Love").

Circa 1990 – while still with Cardiacs – Drake formed The Grown-Ups with himself on keyboards and vocals. This was a short-lived project notable for being the first time Drake worked with guitarist/composer Craig Fortnam (whom he'd later work with in Lake of Puppies and North Sea Radio Orchestra). The other band members were the then-current Cardiacs drummer Dominic Luckman and two other former Cardiacs members (keyboard player and co-singer Mark Cawthra and bass player Jon Bastable (from The Trudy and who'd been a backup Cardiac during Cawthra's tenure in the band). The Grown-Ups recorded five songs, which have never been released.

In May 1991, Drake left Cardiacs, believing that he needed a change. He has, however, maintained his links with the band, playing support slots and guesting at various live performances as well as appearing as a guest player on two albums released by Cardiacs after his departure (Heaven Born and Ever Bright and Sing to God).

Despite leaving Cardiacs, Drake remained a member of the "Mr and Mrs Smith and Mr Drake" project, which by 1991 had been renamed the Sea Nymphs and had recorded enough material for a new album. A 7" Sea Nymphs single called "Appealing to Venus" was released in 1991, given away free with the first 500 copies of Cardiacs 12" single "Day Is Gone" (it was later made available from the fan-club, and was eventually re-released on CD in 1998 by Org Records with additional material added). The band's eponymous album The Sea Nymphs was initially released on cassette in 1992 and was only available from the Cardiacs fan-club (it was not released on CD until 1995). The Sea Nymphs supported All About Eve on their "Ultraviolet" tour of 1992.

The Sea Nymphs were briefly reactivated in 1998 and reissued their "Appealing to Venus" single on CD. The band played a Radio 1 John Peel Session on 4 October 1998 (performing "Eating A Heart Out", "Lilly White's Party", "The Sea Ritual" and "Sea Snake Beware"), which was re-broadcast as a "classic Peel Session" on BBC Radio 6 on 4 May 2009. Drake had claimed that material for at least one more Sea Nymphs album had been recorded, but that the trio had not yet got round to finishing it off and releasing it, but second album On The Dry Land finally saw a release at the end of 2016.

Work with Nervous, Wood and Lake of Puppies (1992–1999)
Soon after leaving Cardiacs Drake teamed up with Dean Gainsburgh-Watkins (bass guitar, formerly of Here & Now), Justin Travis (vocals), Richard "Dicky" Cripps (acoustic guitar), Keith Holden (harmonica), Bernie Holden (clarinet), Oscar O'Lachlainn (electric guitar and drums), Barney Crockford (drums) and Melvin Duffy (pedal steel guitar) to form the folk/country/rock band Nervous. Compared to Cardiacs, Nervous provided a rootsier songwriting style with opportunities for improvisation which appealed to Drake, who took the opportunity to familiarise himself with the Hammond organ and Fender Rhodes electric piano in addition to the pianos, harmoniums and synthesizers which he'd played previously. The band gigged in London regularly (with notable shows at the Royal Albert Hall and Ronnie Scott's) and released an album called Son of the Great Outdoors on Grapevine Records in 1996. Some of the album was recorded in Paul McCartney's Hoghill Studio in Sussex (reportedly, Richard Cripps was in a relationship with Paul's daughter at the time).

Circa 1994 (and while still working with Nervous), Drake formed the band Lake of Puppies. This featured himself on keyboards and vocals, with Sharron Saddington on bass guitar and vocals, Craig Fortnam on nylon-string acoustic guitar and vocals, and Chin Keeler on drums. Drake has professed "great affection" for this band, which gigged frequently (especially in clubs around the Camden area of London), and recorded three songs which remain unreleased. A fourth Lake of Puppies track, "Large Life", appears on the Cardiacs and Affectionate Friends compilation album of 2001. (Sharron Saddington and Craig Fortnam were later to marry and to form the cross-disciplinary chamber music ensemble North Sea Radio Orchestra, to which Drake would contribute.)

On leaving Nervous in 1997 Drake joined country-rockers Wood (a country rock band led by singer-songwriter James Maddock). He remained with the band for two years, playing on six tours of the United States. He also appeared on Wood's only album, 2001's Songs from Stamford Hill (albeit as a guest musician playing keyboards on only one track, "Could I Be").

Solo career (2001–present)
By the late 1990s Drake had composed a very large number of original piano pieces, which Tim Smith then encouraged him to write lyrics for. Smith went on to produce sessions for Drake over the next few years, resulting in the release of the "Melancholy World" single in 2002, followed by Drake's debut solo album William D.Drake which was released on Smith's label All My Eye and Betty Martin Music in 2003. (The song "Fiery Pyre" from this album had also found its way onto the Cardiacs and Affectionate Friends compilation album in 2001.) As gig offers came in Drake put together a live band with a somewhat shifting line-up, the set list depending on which musicians were available. He played at various points over the next five years while working on new material and various projects.

In February 2007, Drake recorded a session for BBC Radio 6 to promote the next stage of his solo career. This consisted of not one but two albums, released simultaneously on two different record labels, both appearing on 5 February 2007.

Briny Hooves (released on sheBear Records) was a more lushly-arranged and orchestrated song-based follow up to William D.Drake, recorded with a multitude of musicians and singers and meeting with considerable critical success. Hi-Fi World called it "a beautifully crafted album of mature, powerful and moody pop songs", while Q Magazine's Tom Doyle commented "(Drake's) frenetic piano-playing inspired Blur, and here the ex-Cardiacs keyboardist turns his own '60s-refracted take on British art-pop: one part Robyn Hitchcock, one part a deeper-voiced Robert Wyatt."

Yews Paw (released on the Onomatopoeia label) was an album of thirteen unaccompanied acoustic piano pieces. All of these were original Drake compositions, although inspirations included classical composers such as Debussy, Rachmaninov, Paderewski, Prokofiev and Hindemith as well as jazz, Walt Disney films and Edward Lear. As with Briny Hooves, the album was well received. John L. Walters reviewed Yews Paw  in The Guardian, describing it as "piano miniatures whose 'light classical' veneer peels back to reveal a tough musical heart."

In December 2010, a William D. Drake cover version of the Tim Smith song "Savour" appeared as the opening track on Leader of the Starry Skies: A Tribute To Tim Smith, Songbook 1, a fundraising compilation album to benefit the hospitalised Smith. 
(The original version of the song appeared on Tim Smith's Extra Special OceanLandWorld.)

Drake's fourth album The Rising of the Lights was released in spring 2011. It features yet another band line-up as well as instrumentation including hurdy-gurdy, clarinet, saxophone and an array of vintage keyboards alongside more traditional rock instruments. A couple of songs were written whilst Drake was still in Cardiacs and he has commented "There's a spice of that time on this album."

In 2023, Drake contibuted a piano ballad titled "Where Do You Go", produced by Mieko Shimizu, for the collaborative EP Write to Be.

Work with North Sea Radio Orchestra & The fFortingtons (2004–present)
Since 2004, Drake has been involved with North Sea Radio Orchestra, the chamber ensemble led by his former Lake of Puppies colleagues Craig and Sharon Fortnam. The ensemble has performed songs and compositions written or co-written by Drake (including his setting of "Mimnermus in Church") and Drake has performed with them as both pianist and member of the vocal chorus. He has also played as part of an occasional acoustic trio with the Fortnams, under the name of The fFortingtons.

Sessions work
William D. Drake played keyboards with prog-goth band Lefaye during their support tour with The Cure in 1995. He also played keyboards for Slowdive/Mojave 3 singer Rachel Goswell on her debut solo album Waves Are Universal and the accompanying tour, as well as working with The Loose Salute (another Mojave 3 spin-off project). Most recently, he played organ on the track "Orange Drop" on Funki Porcini's 2009 album Plod.

Musical style

Drake's music draws on a wide variety of sources including psychedelic rock (such as the work of Syd Barrett and Peter Hammill), sea shanties, Early Music (such as madrigals), and both classical and modernist solo piano music (including that of Dmitri Shostakovich). He has also displayed a taste for composing poetry settings featuring Jacobean and Romantic sources.

Discography

Solo

Albums
William D.Drake (2003) – All My Eye And Betty Martin Music
Briny Hooves (2007) – sheBear Records
Yews Paw (2007) – Onomatopoeia Records
The Rising of the Lights (2011) – Onomatopoeia Records
Revere Reach (2015) - Onomatopoeia Records

Singles/EPs
"Melancholy World" (2002) CD single – Super 8 Recordings
"Earthy Shrine" (2007) 7" single – Onomatopoeia Records
"Lawrence" (2012) digital single – Self-released

Compilation appearances
Various Artists, Leader of the Starry Skies: A Tribute To Tim Smith, Songbook 1 (2010) album of cover versions of songs by Tim Smith – contributes cover version of "Savour"
Various Artists, Cardiacs and Affectionate Friends (2001) album – contributes "Fiery Pyre"
Various Artists, The Central Element (2011) album – contributes "Bond of the Herd"
Various Artists, The Box album – contributes "One Armed Bandits".
Various Artists, A Letter A Day - ATONA triple album - contributes "Serendipity Doodah" https://atona.bandcamp.com/album/atona-a-letter-a-day-hear-no-evil
Various Artists, Write to Be (2023) EP – contributes "Where Do You Go"

With Nervous
Son of the Great Outdoors (1996) album

With Lake of Puppies
Various Artists, Cardiacs and Affectionate Friends (2001) album – contributes "Large Life"

As session/guest musician
Rachel Goswell, Waves Are Universal, (2004) album
Rachel Goswell, The Sleep Shelter EP, (2003) CD EP
Wood, Songs from Stamford Hill, (2001) album
Silver Ginger 5, 'Black Leather Mojo' (2001) album
Funki Porcini, Plod, (2009) album

References

External links

William D. Drake homepage
William D. Drake blog
William D. Drake @ MySpace
Onomatopoeia Records

Living people
English rock keyboardists
English rock pianists
English rock musicians
English songwriters
Psychedelic musicians
1962 births
21st-century pianists
Cardiacs members
North Sea Radio Orchestra members
The Sea Nymphs (band) members